Shelf Life, Shelf life, or Shelflife may refer to:

 Shelf life, the length of time that perishable items are considered suitable for storage, sale, use, or consumption

Music
 "Shelf Life", a song by Seven Mary Three from The Crow: City of Angels film soundtrack
 "Shelf Life", a song by Violent Soho from their 2020 album Everything Is A-OK
 Shelf-Life (album), 2004 album by Uri Caine
 Shelf Life (Northeast Party House album), 2020 album by Northeast Party House
 Shelflife, 2007 album by Calibre
 Shelflife Records, an American record label

Other uses
 Shelf Life (2004 film) or Subhuman, a Canadian horror film
 Shelf Life (film), a 1993 American film by Paul Bartel
 Shelf Life (novel), a 2004 novel by Robert Corbet
 "Shelf Life" (The Fairly OddParents), an episode of The Fairly OddParents
 Shelf Life, a web series by Yuri Lowenthal and Tara Platt

See also
 Service life